Lieutenant Colonel Frederick Cockayne Elton VC (23 April 1832 – 24 March 1888) was an English recipient of the Victoria Cross, the highest and most prestigious award for gallantry in the face of the enemy that can be awarded to British and Commonwealth forces.

Details
Major Elton was born in Whitestaunton, Somerset to Reverend William Tierney Elton and Lucy Caroline Elton, daughter of Sir Charles Abraham Elton, 6th Baronet.  His paternal grandmother was Catherine Bayard, a descendant of Nicholas Bayard, Stephanus Van Cortlandt and the Schuyler family, all from British North America. Nicholas's mother was Ann Stuyvesant, who was a sister of Peter Stuyvesant.

He was 22 years old, and a Brevet Major in the 55th Regiment of Foot, British Army during the Crimean War when the following deed took place for which he was awarded the VC.

On 29 March 1855 at Sebastopol, the Crimea, Major Elton, with a small number of men, drove off a party of Russians who were destroying one of the new detached works, taking one prisoner himself. On 7 June he was the first to lead his men from the trenches. On 4 August he was in command of a working party in the advanced trenches in front of the Quarries, encouraging his men to work under very heavy fire and even used a pick and shovel himself to set an example.

Further information
He later served with the 21st Regiment of Foot and the 67th Regiment of Foot achieving the rank of lieutenant colonel.

Victoria Cross and other awards
Elton's Victoria Cross is displayed at the King's Own Royal Border Regiment & Border Regiment Museum in Carlisle Castle, Cumbria, together with the remainder of his group including an engraved copy of his Crimea medal.  His original, regimentally impressed, Crimea medal has appeared on various occasions over the years at different auction houses and is believed to be currently held in Australia.

Elton also received the French Legion d'Honneur and the Turkish Order of Medjidie.

References

External links

Location of grave and VC medal (Somerset)
 

55th Regiment of Foot officers
67th Regiment of Foot officers
1832 births
1888 deaths
Burials in Somerset
Frederick Cockayne
British Army personnel of the Crimean War
British Army recipients of the Victoria Cross
British recipients of the Victoria Cross
Crimean War recipients of the Victoria Cross
English people of Dutch descent
People from South Somerset (district)
Recipients of the Legion of Honour
Royal Scots Fusiliers officers
Frederick Cockayne
Frederick Cockayne
Military personnel from Somerset